This is a list of members of the Tasmanian House of Assembly between the 9 May 1931 election and the 9 June 1934 election. The 1931 election produced a landslide victory for the Nationalists, in what turned out to be the non-Labor parties' last term in office until 1969.

Notes
  Nationalist MHA for Denison, Charles Grant, was elected to the Australian Senate at a joint sitting of Parliament on 2 March 1932. A recount on 14 March 1932 resulted in Nationalist candidate Arndell Lewis being elected.
  Nationalist MHA for Bass, Howard Barber, resigned on 26 May 1933. A recount on 6 June 1933 resulted in Nationalist candidate Dr Herbert Postle being elected—the first member of a Tasmanian parliament to hold a doctorate (Doctor of Laws from the University of Melbourne).

Sources
 
 Parliament of Tasmania (2006). The Parliament of Tasmania from 1856

Members of Tasmanian parliaments by term
20th-century Australian politicians